Chuba Robert-Shamar Hubbard (born June 11, 1999) is a Canadian professional American football running back for the Carolina Panthers of the National Football League (NFL). He played college football at Oklahoma State, where he was named the Big 12 Offensive Player of the Year and won the Jon Cornish Trophy in 2019. Hubbard was drafted by the Panthers in the fourth round of the 2021 NFL Draft.

Early years
Growing up in Edmonton, Alberta and later moving to Sherwood Park, Hubbard attended Bev Facey Community High School, where he played Canadian football. During his three years, he rushed for 6,880 yards on 458 attempts with 82 touchdowns. He committed to  Oklahoma State University to play college football in the United States.

College career
After redshirting his first year at Oklahoma State in 2017, Hubbard played in 13 games in 2018 and had 740 rushing yards on 124 carries with seven touchdowns. He returned as Oklahoma State's starting running back in 2019 and had a stellar year rushing for 2,094 yards on 328 carries and 21 touchdowns.  Despite speculation that he would declare for the 2020 NFL Draft after this season, Hubbard announced that he would return to school for his redshirt junior year. He was awarded the Jon Cornish Trophy as the top Canadian in NCAA football for the season.

In June 2020, Hubbard threatened to boycott the football team and any affiliation with the university after a photo surfaced showing Oklahoma State head coach Mike Gundy wearing a T-shirt promoting the One America News Network, a far right news channel. Gundy subsequently issued an apology, saying he was disgusted by OAN's coverage of the Black Lives Matter movement. Hubbard eventually apologized for the way he handled the situation

Professional career

Hubbard was selected by the Carolina Panthers in the fourth round (126th overall) of the 2021 NFL Draft. He was also selected by the Calgary Stampeders in the fifth round (43rd overall) of the 2021 CFL Draft before signing a four-year contract, worth $4.2 million, with the Panthers on May 6, 2021.

References

External links
Carolina Panthers bio
Oklahoma State Cowboys bio

1999 births
Living people
Sportspeople from Edmonton
American football running backs
Black Canadian players of American football
Oklahoma State Cowboys football players
All-American college football players
Carolina Panthers players
Jon Cornish Trophy winners
Gridiron football people from Alberta